Quiroga is a municipality in the province of Lugo, part of the autonomous community of Galicia, northwestern Spain.

The main economic activities are agriculture (emphasis on the cultivation of the grapevine), animal breeding and mining.

The olive tree is growing also in this area, which is quite unusual in Galicia. Oil is made by artisans.

The municipality of Quiroga is an interesting natural area (more than 50% of the total area is protected).

The great location of the valley, makes it suitable for sports such as paragliding, hiking, rafting, etc.

Municipalities in the Province of Lugo